West Kelowna, formerly known as Westbank and colloquially known as Westside, is a city in British Columbia's  Okanagan Valley. The city encompasses several distinct neighbourhoods, including Casa Loma, Gellatly, Glenrosa, Lakeview Heights, Shannon Lake, Smith Creek, Rose Valley, Westbank, and West Kelowna Estates. West Kelowna had an estimated population of 34,883 (BC Statistics) as of December 31, 2018.

West Kelowna incorporated December 6, 2007, as Westside District Municipality, so chosen to reflect the name of a former Central Okanagan Regional District rural electoral area. On January 30, 2009, the municipality was renamed West Kelowna. The municipality was reclassified as the City of West Kelowna on June 26, 2015. The general area is also sometimes referred to as Greater Westside, Westbank, and Westside.

History 
Westside District Municipality was established December 6, 2007, following a referendum on June 16, 2007, in which Westside residents voted to incorporate by a margin of 5,924 votes to 5,582. The other choice was amalgamation with the City of Kelowna, with a previous ballot question offering the option of remaining unincorporated within the Regional District of Central Okanagan's former Westside Electoral Area. The vote was strongly split along geographical lines, with voters from Westbank, Glenrosa, and other areas farther from the City of Kelowna voting to incorporate in larger numbers and voters living closer to Kelowna typically choosing amalgamation.

Rosalind Neis was elected as the first mayor of the newly incorporated area for a term of one year. On November 15, 2008, Doug Findlater was elected the second mayor of West Kelowna. Findlater served for three terms as mayor. On October 20, 2018, Gord Milsom was elected as the third person to serve as municipality's mayor.

During the November 2008 civic election, Westside residents were also asked in a "Community Opinion Poll" to select a permanent name for the fledgling municipality. The new name "West Kelowna", with 3,841 votes, was selected by a narrow margin over the closest contender, "Westbank", with 3,675 votes. The West Kelowna name was subsequently confirmed by the municipal council on December 9, 2008. The new name became official January 30, 2009, after the Government of British Columbia approved the change to the Letters Patent.

Geography 
The City of West Kelowna is located on the central western shores and hillsides of Okanagan Lake and is the primary gateway to the Central Okanagan from the west via Highway 97C, the Okanagan Connector.

Neighbourhoods within the city's jurisdiction include Gellatly/Goats Peak, Glenrosa, Shannon Lake, Smith Creek and Westbank in the south, which comprise approximately half of the total population, and Bear Creek, Casa Loma, Green Bay, Lakeview Heights, Pritchard/Sunnyside, Raymer, Rose Valley, South Boucherie and West Kelowna Estates in the north. Many of these neighbourhoods, including Glenrosa, Gellatly, Lakeview Heights, Sunnyside, and Westbank have rich histories, some dating to the early to mid-19th century.

Bordering the City of West Kelowna are the District of Peachland, Central Okanagan West Electoral Area, and two self-governing reserves of the Westbank First Nation, Tsinstikeptum 9 and Tsinstikeptum 10. Approximately 10,000 non-band members, including 800 First Nation Westbank band members live on the reserves.

Demographics 

Ethnicity 

Note: Totals greater than 100% due to multiple origin responses.

Religion 
According to the 2021 census, religious groups in West Kelowna included:
Irreligion (19,990 persons or 55.9%)
Christianity (14,850 persons or 41.5%)
Sikhism (235 persons or 0.7%)
Hinduism (105 persons or 0.3%)
Judaism (105 persons or 0.3%)
Buddhism (125 persons or 0.3%)
Islam (100 persons or 0.3%)
Other (230 persons or 0.6%)

Economy 
West Kelowna has a diverse economy, which includes agriculture, construction, finance, food and retail services, light industry, lumber manufacturing, technology, tourism and world renowned wineries. More than 2,200 business licences are issued annually.

The Greater Westside economic region has a population of more than 52,000 people, with 34,883 living in the City of West Kelowna, an estimated 10,000 residing in Westbank First Nation (based on projections since the 2016 national census), over 5,671 in Peachland (BC Stats, 2018) and approximately 2,000 in the surrounding rural areas.

The Greater Westside is part of the larger Central Okanagan Regional District and economic region with a population of 208,852 (BC Stats, 2018) residents.

Traditional shopping areas in West Kelowna are Boucherie Centre, Lakeview Heights Shopping Centre, Westbank Centre and the West Kelowna Business Park, which offer a variety of retail outlets, cafes and restaurants, and tourist accommodations and attractions. The City of West Kelowna boasts a scenic wine trail; a dozen wineries, with world renowned wines, line the route. Visitors also enjoy the a farm loop, featuring varied local agricultural products, seasonal farmers' market and the Gellatly Bay multi-use corridor, which includes the CNR Wharf Aquatic Park.

Major private employers include Gorman Bros. Lumber and Mission Hill Family Estate Winery. Major public employers include Interior Health and Central Okanagan Public Schools (School District 23).

West Kelowna's business areas are also complemented by those in the Westbank First Nation, which include various big box stores, cafes and restaurants, retail outlets, services, theatres and tourist accommodations and attractions.

Education 
West Kelowna is located within School District 23 Central Okanagan. Mount Boucherie Senior Secondary School serves grades 9 through 12, and is the only high school in the municipality. West Kelowna has two middle schools, serving grades 6 through 8: Constable Neil Bruce Middle School and Glenrosa Middle School. Nine public elementary schools are located in the municipality: Chief Tomat, George Pringle (includes French immersion programming), Glenrosa Elementary School, Helen Gorman, Hudson Road, Mar Jok, Rose Valley, and Shannon Lake. Private elementary schools are Our Lady of Lourdes Catholic School and Sensisyusten House of Learning, which is located in the neighbouring Westbank First Nation Tsinstikeptum 9 community. Post-secondary educational opportunities are available in the nearby City of Kelowna, including two major public institutions: UBC Okanagan and Okanagan College.

Recreation and culture 
The Mount Boucherie Community Centre includes Royal LePage Place arena, home to the BCHL team the West Kelowna Warriors, and Jim Lind Arena for ice sport clubs such as hockey, figure skating, and ringette.

The city has a lakefront walking trail alongside Gellatly Road and several swimming areas along Okanagan Lake, including Willow Beach.

Johnson Bentley Memorial Aquatic Centre, in downtown Westbank, offers indoor public swimming and recreational programs.

Several community and regional parks are scattered throughout the municipality, offering soccer pitches, ball fields, children's play areas, and hiking trails. The award-winning Constable Neil Bruce Soccer Fields are a popular recreational destination as are the Mount Boucherie Ball Diamonds (lighted), the Mount Boucherie Pickleball Courts, Lakeview Heights Tennis Courts (lighted) and Rosewood Sports Field (lighted). A community garden, pergola, two off-leash dog parks and a popular children's water park are located in the Westbank Town Centre Park, off Hebert Road.

Free Friday night concerts are held in July and August at Annette Beaudreau Amphitheatre in Memorial Park in Westbank Centre at the south end of Old Okanagan Highway. The amphitheatre and park are also home to a large number of events and concerts during the annual Westside Daze celebration which includes a popular parade and midway. Memorial Park also features a skateboard park.

Popular trails are located in Eain Lamont and Mount Boucherie Parks and in Glen Canyon, Goats Peak, Kalamoir and Rose Valley Regional Parks.

Shannon Lake Golf Course is the only 18-hole golf course in the City of West Kelowna; however, Two Eagles Golf Course in the neighbouring Westbank First Nation also offers 18-holes, a putting course and a driving range.

The Westbank Museum offers pioneer exhibits, artefacts and archives. Smaller galleries sell works by local artists and potters. Neighbouring Westbank First Nation operates an indigenous museum.

The municipality funds youth and seniors' centres in downtown Westbank.

Telemark is a popular winter recreational area offering snowshoeing and cross country skiing opportunities.

Notes

References

External links 

 
Cities in British Columbia
Populated places in the Regional District of Central Okanagan
Populated places on Okanagan Lake